Dwight Merriman is an American Internet executive, racing driver, and entrepreneur in New York City's Silicon Alley. Best known for co-founding DoubleClick with Kevin O'Connor and serving as its CTO for 10 years, Merriman currently serves as the founder and chairman of MongoDB Inc.

Business career 
DoubleClick was sold in 2005 for $1.1 billion to Hellman and Friedman LLC, and Merriman stepped down as CTO shortly thereafter. DoubleClick was acquired by Google for $3.1 billion in March 2008.

After leaving DoubleClick, Merriman, along with former DoubleClick CEO Kevin Ryan, founded AlleyCorp, a network of affiliated Internet companies, including MongoDB Inc., ShopWiki, Business Insider, and Gilt Groupe.

Despite business duties at MongoDB, Merriman still writes code.

Racing career 
Merriman begun his racing career in 2018, driving a Volkswagen Golf for Heinlein Racing Development in the Pirelli World Challenge. He would end 9th overall at the end of the season. Two years later, in 2020, Merriman would make his debut in the 24 Hours of Daytona for Era Motorsport alongside drivers Kyle Tilley, Ryan Lewis, and Nicolas Minassian. They would finish 4th in their class, 11th overall.

In 2021, he would return with Era Motorsport to the 24 Hours of Daytona alongside Tilley, Ryan Dalziel, and Paul-Loup Chatin. The group would go on to record 787 laps, winning their class.

Racing record

Career summary 

* Season still in progress.

Complete WeatherTech SportsCar Championship results 
(key)(Races in bold indicate pole position. Races in italics indicate fastest race lap in class. Results are overall/class)

* Season still in progress

Complete Asian Le Mans Series results 
(key) (Races in bold indicate pole position)

24 Hours of Daytona results

References

Living people
American computer businesspeople
American technology chief executives
American technology company founders
Miami University alumni
American racing drivers
24 Hours of Daytona drivers
1968 births
Racing drivers from New York (state)
Racing drivers from New York City
Sportspeople from New York City
WeatherTech SportsCar Championship drivers
European Le Mans Series drivers
Asian Le Mans Series drivers